Oswald Peake (7 March 1920 – October 1997) was an English professional rugby league footballer who played in the 1930s and 1940s.

Background
Ossie Peake's birth was registered in Warrington district, Lancashire, England, and he died aged 77.

Playing career

International honours
While at Warrington, Peake won three caps for England. All three came in matches against Wales played between 1939 and 1941.

Challenge Cup Final appearances
Ossie Peake played , i.e. number 2, in Huddersfield's 13–9 aggregate victory over Bradford Northern in the 1944–45 Challenge Cup Final during the 1944–45 season; the 7-4 victory in the first-leg at Fartown Ground, Huddersfield on Saturday 28 April 1945, and the 6-5 victory in the second-leg at Odsal Stadium, Bradford on Saturday 5 May 1945.

County Cup Final appearances
Ossie Peake played left-, i.e. number 4, in Warrington's 8-14 defeat by Wigan in the 1948 Lancashire County Cup Final during the 1948–49 season at Station Road, Swinton on Saturday 13 November 1948.

Club career
Ossie Peake made his dêbut for Warrington on Saturday 2 April 1938, and he played his last match for Warrington on Saturday 13 November 1948.

Genealogical information
Peake's marriage to Elsie (née Colbourne) was registered during second ¼ 1942 in Newton district. They had children; Andrew F. Peake (birth registered during first ¼  in Warrington district)

References

External links
 (archived by web.archive.org) Statistics at wolvesplayers.thisiswarrington.co.uk
 (archived by web.archive.org) Statistics at wolvesplayers.thisiswarrington.co.uk (martini)

1920 births
1997 deaths
England national rugby league team players
English rugby league players
Huddersfield Giants players
Rugby league centres
Rugby league players from Warrington
Rugby league wingers
Warrington Wolves players